David J. Hanson (born April 12, 1954) is an American former professional ice hockey player. He played 33 games in the National Hockey League between 1978 and 1980, and 103 games in the World Hockey Association between 1977 and 1979.

Biography
Hanson was born in Cumberland, Wisconsin, and grew up in Saint Paul, Minnesota, where he eventually starred in football, baseball and hockey at Humboldt Senior High School.

Hanson continued playing hockey for the St. Paul Vulcans and for Herb Brooks's University of Minnesota college team. Hanson played four seasons for the Detroit Red Wings and Minnesota North Stars of the National Hockey League, and the New England Whalers, Minnesota Fighting Saints and Birmingham Bulls of the World Hockey Association.

He was originally cast as "Dave 'Killer' Carlson" in the 1977 film Slap Shot, but when Jack Carlson was unable to perform because his team was in the playoffs, Hanson was recast as "Jack Hanson", one of the Hanson Brothers. Professional actor Jerry Houser was then cast as "Killer", the character based on Dave Hanson. Hanson appeared in several other films, and won a "DVD Premiere Award", along with fellow Hanson Brothers Steve and Jeff Carlson (brothers of Jack Carlson), for his part in the 2002 sequel Slap Shot 2: Breaking the Ice.

In 1977, Hanson married Sue Kaschalk, a coal miner's daughter from Nanty Glo, Pennsylvania. He has two daughters and one son, Christian, a center whose professional career included time with the Toronto Maple Leafs, AHL teams and the Norwegian champion Stavanger Oilers. At one point Hanson was general manager of the Capital District Islanders in upstate New York, then the New York Islanders farm team and the Albany River Rats, the New Jersey Devils farm team.  he resides in Pittsburgh, Pennsylvania, and manages a sports center at Robert Morris University.

Career statistics

Regular season and playoffs

References

External links
 
 HansonBrothers.net
 Dave Hanson on his book, Slapshot Original

1954 births
Living people
Adirondack Red Wings players
American men's ice hockey defensemen
American male film actors
Birmingham Bulls (CHL) players
Birmingham Bulls players
Detroit Red Wings players
Hampton Gulls (AHL) players
Hampton Gulls (SHL) players
Ice hockey players from Wisconsin
Ice hockey people from Saint Paul, Minnesota
Indianapolis Checkers (CHL) players
Johnstown Jets players
Kansas City Red Wings players
Minnesota Fighting Saints draft picks
Minnesota Fighting Saints players
Minnesota North Stars players
New England Whalers players
Oklahoma City Stars players
People from Cumberland, Wisconsin
Rhode Island Reds players
Toledo Goaldiggers players
Undrafted National Hockey League players